Bati is a district located in Takeo province, in southern Cambodia. According to the 1998 census of Cambodia, it had a population of 113,693.

Administration
As of 2019, Bati has 15 communes, 168 villages.

Notable people
 Haing S. Ngor, Academy Awards actor.

References

 
Districts of Takéo province